The 2017 Judo Grand Slam Paris was held in Paris, France, from 11 to 12 February 2017.

Medal summary

Men's events

Women's events

Source Results

Medal table

References

External links
 

2017 IJF World Tour
2017 Judo Grand Slam
Judo
Grand Slam Paris 2017
Judo
Judo